The Campeonato Goiano - Segunda Divisão, also called , is the second division of the football league of the state of Goiás, Brazil.

Format

First stage 
Teams are divided in groups.
Double round-robin, in which all teams home-and-away games against the team from other group.
Standard round-robin, in which all teams play each other once within the group.

Second stage 
Home-and-away playoffs with the top 4 teams. 

The winner of the second stage is crowned the champion.

The two teams last placed overall in the first stage are relegated to the second division.

As in any other Brazilian soccer championship, the format can change every year.

Clubs

List of champions

Notes

Sírio Libanês changed their name to Botafogo.
Grêmio Inhumense has moved from Inhumas to Anápolis, and changed their name to Grêmio Anápolis.

Titles by team 

Teams in bold still active.

By city

References

External links 

FGF Official Website
RSSSF

State football leagues in Brazil
Campeonato Goiano